Cameroon competed at the 1988 Summer Olympics in Seoul, South Korea.

Competitors
The following is the list of number of competitors in the Games.

Results by event

Athletics
Men's Long Jump
 Frédéric Ebong-Salle
 Qualification — 7.65m (→ did not advance)

Women's Discus Throw
 Jeanne Ngo Minyemeck
 Qualification — no mark (→ did not advance)

Women's Shot Put
 Jeanne Ngo Minyemeck
 Qualification — 12.73m (→ did not advance)

References

Official Olympic Reports

Nations at the 1988 Summer Olympics
1988
1988 in Cameroonian sport